{{DISPLAYTITLE:C3H2ClF5O}}
The molecular formula C3H2ClF5O (molar mass: 184.49 g/mol, exact mass: 183.9714 u) may refer to:

 Enflurane (2-chloro-1,1,2,-trifluoroethyl-difluoromethyl ether)
 Isoflurane